"Feels Like Fire" is a song by American rock band Santana featuring British singer-songwriter Dido. Written by Dido, her brother Rollo Armstrong, and Pnut, the song was released as the second single outside the United States from Santana's 19th studio album, Shaman (2002). "Feels Like Fire" charted in New Zealand, where it reached number 26 and spent 13 weeks in the top 40. A promotional disc was also distributed in Poland.

Credits and personnel
Credits are lifted from the Shaman album booklet.

Studios
 Engineered at Fantasy Studios (Berkeley, California) and Metropolis Studios (London, England)
 Mixed at Metropolis Studios (London, England)

Personnel

 Dido Armstrong – writing, lead vocals, production
 Rollo Armstrong – writing, production
 Pnut – writing
 Carlos Santana – lead electric guitar
 Ola Taylor – backing vocals
 Pauline Taylor – backing vocals
 Martin McCorry – acoustic guitar
 Dave Randall – additional electric guitar
 Chester Thompson – keyboards
 Mark Bates – keyboards

 Sister Bliss – keyboards
 Jody Linscott – percussion
 Phill Brown – recording (vocals)
 Ash Howes – mixing
 Jim Gaines – engineering
 Grippa – engineering
 David Frazer – engineering
 Ben Conrad – assistant engineering
 Justin Lieberman – Pro Tools
 Christopher Forrest – Pro Tools

Charts

References

2002 songs
2002 singles
Arista Records singles
Bertelsmann Music Group singles
Dido (singer) songs
Santana (band) songs
Song recordings produced by Dido (singer)
Song recordings produced by Rollo Armstrong
Songs written by Dido (singer)
Songs written by Rollo Armstrong